Dvorana Mladosti is a sports hall in Rijeka, with sporting, cultural, business and entertainment events. The hall was built in Trsat in 1973. The size of the hall is 5,458 m2, and the surface of outer space is 10,486 m2. The main part of the hall consists of the main arena, two small halls for heating, a hall for judo, karate, weightlifting and billiards hall, and in the halls there are 4 dressing rooms, 2 fitness centres, office spaces and sports associations, press centre and catering facilities and retail spaces. The capacity of the hall is 2,960 seats and 1,000 standing places.

Major events 
1987 IHF Men's Junior World Championship 
2000 European Men's Handball Championship
2003 World Women's Handball Championship

External links 
The hall at Rijeka.hr

Event venues established in 1973
Sports venues in Rijeka
Indoor arenas in Croatia
Basketball venues in Croatia
Handball venues in Croatia